Idiopidonia pedalis is a species of beetle in the family Cerambycidae, the only species in the genus Idiopidonia.

References

Lepturinae